Romowe Rikoito is a neofolk band from historical region of Kaliningrad, Russia, currently based in Nida, Lithuania. It was formed by Glabbis Niktorius at 1995 and named after ancient Prussian spiritual center Romowe (also known as Rikoyto). The group has published 5 albums – first two albums Narcissism and L’Automne Eternel based on ideas of melancholy, death and grief, while Āustradēiwa, Undēina and Nawamār are dedicated to Old Prussia. They sing in the Old Prussian language.

History 

In 2014, Lithuanian independent music label published Romowe Rikoito's 4th album Undēina which is described as a "magical journey through modern Western Baltic world" by the label Dangus. Almost all compositions are performed in Prussian language, beside using dark folk instruments, its sounding enriched by folk instruments such as kanklės and ocarina. Undēina is dedicated to the Prussian mythology, sages and sacred places. All sounds were recorded in nature while visiting forests, rivers, sacred places of Old Prussia.

Musical style and lyrical themes 

The music of Romowe Rikoito is characterized as "deep, unique, full of twilight, melancholy, sacred harmony, mysterious hope and decadence" by label Dangus. Compositions are performed by acoustic guitars, cello, flute, violin, keyboards. This band performed various poems written by Aleister Crowley, Dante Gabriel Rossetti, Gerard de Nerval, Chidiock Tichborne also a Prussian version of intro of the first Lithuanian poem "Metai" by Kristijonas Donelaitis.

Members

Current 
 Glabbis Niktorius – vocal, guitars 
 Alwārmija – vocal
 Aleks Āulaukis (Alexey Popov) – guitars 
 Anny (Anna Ivanova) – cello

Former 
 Johnny (Sergey Ivanov) – guitars
 Poonk (Dmitry Demidov) – violin, tape, keyboards, sounds
 Victoria Koulbachnaya – flute, keyboards
 Elena Kosheleva – violin
 Julia – voice

Discography 
 Narcissism (1997)
 L’Automne Eternel (2000)
 Āustradēiwa (2005)
 Undēina (2014)
 Nawamār (2016)

References

Links 
Official page
Official Facebook page
Official BandCamp page

Neofolk music groups
Musical groups established in 1995
Lithuanian musical groups